The Tangri River, also called the Dangri River, which originates in the Shivalik Hills, is a tributary of the Ghaggar River in the Haryana state of India.

Origin and route
The Tangri river originates in the Shivalik hills on the border of Haryana and Himachal Pradesh State, and flows along the Haryana and Punjab border before meeting with the Ghaggar river at the confluence. The basin is classified in two parts, Khadir and Bangar, the higher area that is not flooded in rainy season is called Bangar and the lower flood-prone area is called Khadar.

The Dangri or Tangri is a stream that rises in the Morni Hills of the Siwalik Hills of south-eastern Himachal Pradesh in India, and flows for 70 km in Haryana. It joins the Markanda River (Haryana) at the Haryana-Punjab border north of Sadhpur Viran in the northwest of the Kurukshetra district and south of Mehmudpur Rurki in south Patiala district. The combined Dangir-Markanda stream merges with the Sarsuti River in northeast Kaithal district, east of Diwana and southwest of Adoya, before joining the Ghaggar river just east of Dhandota village near Kasoli town in northwest Kaithal. It is thereafter known as the Ghaggar. Further downstream on the banks of the Ghaggar stands an old derelict fort at Sirsa town named Sarsuti. After the Ottu barrage, the Ghaggar river is called the Hakra River and in Sindh it is called the Nara River. The order of rivers from left to right is the Ghaggar, Dangri, Markanda and Sarsuti. Further left to the right, the Chautang and Somb rivers are tributaries of the Yamuna.

It is believed that Sarsuti is a corruption of the word Sarasvati and that the 6–8 km wide channel of the Sarsuti–Ghaggar system might have once been the Sarasvati River mentioned in the Rig Veda. This Sarsuti channel is currently being revived by the Government of Haryana as the ancient Sarasvat river.

Tributaries
Originating from the Morni Hills, the Tangri joins its southern tributary called the Balaiali River (which originates near the south of the Morni Hills) near Chajju Majra, south of Kharar. Near Panjokhra, southeast of Ambala, the Tangri River divides into two streams that flow north and south of Ambala. Further downstream near Segti and Segta villages, the Tangri River joins its tributary called the Amri River (also known as the Dadri River and the Shahzadpur Wali River, which originates near Rataur)) after Amri has already collected its own tributary called the Omla River.

 Ghaggar, 250 km
Kaushalya river, 20 km, tributary of the Ghaggar which converges in Panchkula
 Markanda river, 90 km, eastern tributary of the Ghaggar
 Dangri river (Tangri), 70 km, western tributary of the Markanda
 Balaiali river, eastern tributary of the Dangri
 Amri river (Dadri River or Shahzadpur Wali river), eastern tributary of the Dangri 
 Omla river, tributary of the Amri river
 Numerous other streams in Yamunanagar district
 Sarsuti, ? km, eastern tributary of the Ghaggar
 Chautang, 9 km, eastern tributary of the Ghaggar

Several archaeologists have identified the old Ghaggar-Hakra River with the Sarasvati river, on the banks of which the Indus Valley civilisation developed.

Gallery

See also 

 Western Yamuna Canal, branches off Yamuna
 Yamuna, a current left-side tributary of the Ganges and an earlier right-side tributary of Sarasvati river
 Sutlej, a current right-side tributary of Indus and an earlier left side tributary of Sarasvati river
 Ganges
 Indus

References

External links 
Sarasvati-Sindhu civilization and Sarasvati River
The Saraswati: Where lies the mystery by Saswati Paik

Rivers of Himachal Pradesh
Rivers of Haryana
Rivers of Punjab, India
Rigvedic rivers
Indus basin
International rivers of Asia
Sarasvati River
Rivers of India